Defkandar (also Romanized as Defkāndar; also known as Defkūndar and Defqāndar) is a village in Keshvar Rural District, Papi District, Khorramabad County, Lorestan Province, Iran. At the 2006 census, its population was 37, in 9 families.

References 

Towns and villages in Khorramabad County